This article shows the women's squads of the participating teams at the 2014 Asian Women's Cup Volleyball Championship.

Head coach: Lang Ping
The following is the Chinese roster in the 2014 Asian Cup Championship.

Head coach: Abbas Barghi
The following is the Iranian roster in the 2014 Asian Cup Championship.

Head coach: Kiyoshi Abo
The following is the Japanese roster in the 2014 Asian Cup Championship.

Head coach: Oleksandr Gutor
The following is the Kazakhstani roster in the 2014 Asian Cup Championship.

Head coach: Lee Son-goo
The following is the Korean roster in the 2014 Asian Cup Championship.

Head coach: Huang Chih-nan
The following is the Taiwanese roster in the 2014 Asian Cup Championship.

Head coach: Kiattipong Radchatagriengkai
The following is the Thai roster in the 2014 Asian Cup Championship.

Head coach: Pham Van Long
The following is the Vietnamese roster in the 2014 Asian Cup Championship.

References

2014 in women's volleyball
Asian volleyball championships women's squads